Michael Russo may refer to:

 Michael Russo (sportswriter), American sports journalist for The Athletic
 Michael Russo (rugby league) (born 1983), rugby league footballer of the 2000s
 Michael Russo of Ralph & Russo

See also
 Michael Dellorusso (born 1983), American soccer player